Mihaela Bene (born July 3, 1973) is a Romanian sprint canoer who competed in the mid-1990s. She was eliminated in the semifinals of the K-4 500 m event at the 1996 Summer Olympics in Atlanta.

External links
Sports-Reference.com profile

1973 births
Canoeists at the 1996 Summer Olympics
Living people
Olympic canoeists of Romania
Romanian female canoeists
Place of birth missing (living people)